Central School Campus, also known as Central School and DeSoto High School, is a historic school complex located at De Soto, Jefferson County, Missouri.  The Central School was built about 1882, and remodeled into its current form in 1950.  It is a 2 1/2- to 3-story rectangular brick building. The DeSoto High School was built in 1927, and is a three-story, textured brick building with a flat roof and accented with limestone or cast stone ornament reflecting the Classical Revival style.

It was listed on the National Register of Historic Places in 2009.

References 

School buildings on the National Register of Historic Places in Missouri
Neoclassical architecture in Missouri
School buildings completed in 1882
School buildings completed in 1927
Buildings and structures in Jefferson County, Missouri
National Register of Historic Places in Jefferson County, Missouri
1882 establishments in Missouri